

The French Liberation Army ( or AFL) was the reunified French Army that arose from the merging of the Armée d'Afrique with the prior Free French Forces ( or FFL) during World War II. The military force of Free France, it participated in the Italian and Tunisian campaigns before joining in the Liberation of France with other Western Allies of World War II. It went on to join the Western Allied invasion of Germany.

History
The French Liberation Army was created in 1943 when the Army of Africa led by General Giraud was combined with the Free French Forces of General de Gaulle.

The AFL participated in the campaigns of Tunisia and Italy; during the Italian campaign the AFL was known as the French Expeditionary Corps in Italy ( en Italie or CEFI) making a quarter of the troops deployed. The AFL was key in the liberation of Corsica, the first French metropolitan department to be liberated. 
The troops that landed on D-Day were the 2nd Armored Division under Philippe Leclerc and the 1st Battalion Marine Commando Fusiliers better known as Commando Kieffer. 
During the Allied invasion of Provence, on 15 August 1944, the AFL made the majority of the troops landing on French shores, capturing the ports of Toulon and Marseille. The French troops in Southern France were now named French First Army and would participate in the Liberation of France and the invasion of South-Western Germany in 1944-45. One of the AFL's garrison and second-line formations, which later helped man the French occupation zone of Germany, was the 10th Infantry Division.

References

Citations

Sources

External links
 « Free French Divisions » on Stone & Stone website

Military history of France during World War II
National liberation armies
Armies in exile during World War II
World War II resistance movements
Guerrilla organizations
Military units and formations established in 1943
Military units and formations disestablished in 1945